was a Japanese athlete who competed at the 1932 and 1936 Olympics. In 1932 he finished sixth in the long jump, while in 1936 he finished third in the long jump, behind Jesse Owens and Luz Long, and won the triple jump event, setting a world record at 16.00 m. This record stood until 1951, when Adhemar da Silva improved it by one centimeter.

Raised in Iwakuni, Tajima graduated in economics from Kyoto Imperial University just prior to competing in the Olympics. His gold medal was Japan's last Olympic track and field gold medal until Naoko Takahashi won the women's marathon at the 2000 Summer Olympics.

Tajima retired from competitive athletics in 1938 but maintained an administrative role as managing director of the Japan Association of Athletics Federations. He was also a member of the Japanese Olympic Committee, coached the Japanese athletics teams at the 1956 and 1964 Olympics, and worked as a lecturer at Chukyo University.

See also
List of Olympic medalists in athletics (men)
Long jump at the Olympics
Triple jump at the Olympics

References

1912 births
1990 deaths
Sportspeople from Osaka Prefecture
Japanese male long jumpers
Japanese male triple jumpers
Olympic male long jumpers
Olympic male triple jumpers
Olympic athletes of Japan
Olympic gold medalists for Japan
Olympic bronze medalists for Japan
Olympic gold medalists in athletics (track and field)
Olympic bronze medalists in athletics (track and field)
Athletes (track and field) at the 1932 Summer Olympics
Athletes (track and field) at the 1936 Summer Olympics
Medalists at the 1936 Summer Olympics
Japan Championships in Athletics winners
World record setters in athletics (track and field)
Kyoto University alumni
Recipients of the Olympic Order